The 2018–19 Toto Cup Leumit was the 29th season of the second tier League Cup (as a separate competition) since its introduction. It was divided into two stages. First, sixteen Liga Leumit teams were divided into four regionalized groups, with the winners advancing to the semi-finals, while the rest of the clubs were scheduled to play classification play-offs. However, the classification matches were only partly played.

In the final, played on 25 December 2018, Hapoel Katamon Jerusalem defeated Hapoel Marmorek 1–0.

Group stage
Groups were allocated according to geographic distribution of the clubs. The groups were announced by the IFA on 19 June 2018.

Group A

Group B

Group C

Group D

Classification play-offs

13-16th classification play-offs

9-12th classification play-offs

5-8th classification play-offs

Finals

Semi-finals

Final

Final rankings

See also
 2018–19 Toto Cup Al
 2018–19 Liga Leumit
 2018–19 Israel State Cup

References

External links
 Official website 

Leumit
Toto Cup Leumit
Toto Cup Leumit